Christos Dagounakis (born 6 October 1978) is a retired Greek football defender.

References

1978 births
Living people
Greek footballers
Ionikos F.C. players
Kallithea F.C. players
Proodeftiki F.C. players
Ethnikos Piraeus F.C. players
Agios Dimitrios F.C. players
Super League Greece players
Association football defenders